The 1965 Chicago Bears season was their 46th regular season completed in the National Football League. The team finished with a  9–5 record, earning them a third-place finish in the NFL Western Conference. The club improved over the dismal 5–9 record of the previous season.
–QB	Rudy Bukich	176 for 312, 2,641 yards, 20 touchdowns.
They started the season 0–3, but thanks to rookies Gale Sayers and Dick Butkus, the team won 9 of the last 11 games. Sayers had a magnificent rookie season, and in one game against the San Francisco 49ers at Chicago's Wrigley Field on December 12, he scored six touchdowns in a 61–20 Bears win, the first time the Bears scored 61 points in a regular-season game. Sayers would set an NFL rookie record with 22 touchdowns in one season. The six-touchdown performance tied an NFL record and set a new Bears record.

The 1965 Bears draft class was named No. 8 on NFL Top 10 draft classes.

Source is Google

Regular season

Schedule

Game summaries

Week 1

Week 2

Week 3

Week 4

    
    
    
    
    
    
    

Rudy Bukich 16/22, 299 Yds

Week 5

    
    
    
    
    
    
    
    
    
    
    
    
    
    

Gale Sayers 297 all-purpose Yds

Week 6

Week 7

Week 8

Week 9

Week 10

Week 11

Week 12

Week 13

Gale Sayers Six Touchdown Game. His last touchdown came on a 85-yard punt return.

Week 14

Standings

Awards and records
Gale Sayers, NFL rookie record, most touchdowns in one season (22)
Gale Sayers, NFL record (tied), most touchdowns in one game (6)
Gale Sayers, club record, most touchdowns in one game (6)

References

Chicago Bears
Chicago Bears seasons
Chicago Bears